Acanthamoeba infection is a cutaneous condition resulting from Acanthamoeba that may result in various skin lesions. Acanthamoeba strains can also infect human eyes causing Acanthamoeba keratitis.

See also 
 Balamuthia infection

References 

Parasitic infestations, stings, and bites of the skin